Cevin Fisher (born Kevin Fisher, October 26, 1963) is an American house music record producer.

Biography
He is best known for songs such as "The Freaks Come Out" (billed as Cevin Fisher's Big Freak) and "(You Got Me) Burning Up", the latter of which featured vocals by Loleatta Holloway. He achieved five entries in the UK top 75 between October 1998 and February 2001.

Discography

Albums
 Underground 2000 (2000)

Singles

See also
List of number-one dance hits (United States)
List of artists who reached number one on the US Dance chart

References

1963 births
Living people
American dance musicians
American house musicians
Club DJs
Musicians from East Orange, New Jersey